John Curteys or Courteys was a Member of Parliament for Lostwithiel in 1406, 1411, and May 1413. He was Mayor of Lostwithiel from 1389 to 1390. He was the son of Thomas Curteys and was the brother of Tristram Curteys, both Members of Parliament for Lostwithiel.

References

14th-century births
15th-century deaths
English MPs 1406
English MPs 1411
English MPs May 1413
Mayors of places in Cornwall
14th-century English politicians
15th-century English politicians
Members of the Parliament of England for Lostwithiel
People from Lostwithiel